Divan is a 2004 documentary film directed by Pearl Gluck. This film documents the director's journey as she returns to her Hungarian roots in order to find a couch that had been in her family for years. During this search the audience gets to witness Gluck explore her true identity, as well as gain a glimpse into Hasidic culture.

Plot 
Pearl Gluck seeks to bring an ancestral couch, upon which esteemed rabbis once slept, back to her family. She travels from her home community of Hasidic Brooklyn to her roots in Hungary. During this journey Gluck meets a colorful cast of people, such as a couch exporter, her ex-communist cousin living in Budapest, a pair of matchmakers, and a group of formerly Orthodox Jews.

Production 
Divan was in production for five years as Gluck's debut feature documentary. It was developed with that assistance of the Sundance Institute.

Reviews 
The film received an overall positive reception from critics, with a 71 score from Metacritic and a 95% score from Rotten Tomatoes.

Screenings and awards 
 Titanic International Filmfestival (2009) Official Selection
 Wisconsin Film Festival Official Selection
 Tribeca Film Festival Official Selection
 Hong Kong Jewish Film Festival Official Selection
 Warsaw Jewish Film Festival Official Selection

References

External links 
 

2004 films
American documentary films
2000s American films